John Finlay (April 22, 1837 – November 13, 1910) was a Canadian politician.

Born in Dummer Township, Peterborough County, Upper Canada, Finlay was educated in the Public Schools of Dummer. A manufacturer, Finlay was Councillor and Reeve of the Village of Norwood and County Councillor. He was elected to the House of Commons of Canada for the electoral district of Peterborough East in the general elections of 1904. A Liberal, he did not run in the 1908 elections.

References
 
 The Canadian Parliament; biographical sketches and photo-engravures of the senators and members of the House of Commons of Canada. Being the tenth Parliament, elected November 3, 1904

1837 births
1910 deaths
Liberal Party of Canada MPs
Members of the House of Commons of Canada from Ontario